Aoife Beggs (born 23 October 1999) is an Irish former cricketer who played as a right-arm medium bowler. She appeared in 3 One Day Internationals for Ireland, all in the 2017 South Africa Quadrangular Series. She played in the Women's Super Series for Typhoons and Scorchers.

References

External links
 
 

1999 births
Living people
Irish women cricketers
Ireland women One Day International cricketers
Cricketers from Dublin (city)
Typhoons (women's cricket) cricketers
Scorchers (women's cricket) cricketers